Nida is an unincorporated community in Johnston County, Oklahoma, United States, along State Highway 22. A post office operated in Nida from 1895 to 1915. The first postmaster was R.F. French. The town was named after his wife, Nida French. It is the nearest community to Fort Washita, a National Historic Landmark.

References

Unincorporated communities in Johnston County, Oklahoma
Unincorporated communities in Oklahoma